John Addison (1920–1998) was a British composer, especially of film scores.

John Addison may also refer to:
John Addison (divine) (fl. 1538), English divine
John Addison (1765–1844), British composer and double-bass player
John Hollings Addison (1929–2010), Canadian politician and businessman
John Addison (MP) (1838–1907), British judge and Conservative politician
John Addison (engineer), Scottish structural engineer

See also
Addison (surname)